Viracocha Patera is a patera, or a complex crater with scalloped edges, on Jupiter's moon Io. It is named after the Quechua creator god Viracocha. The name was adopted by the International Astronomical Union in 1979. Viracocha Patera is a Voyager spacecraft-detected hot spot. To Viracocha Patera's east-northeast is Mithra Patera, and to the northeast is the mountain Silpium Mons.

References

Surface features of Io (moon)